Arctopsyche ladogensis is a species of netspinning caddisfly in the family Hydropsychidae. It is found in Europe and Northern Asia (excluding China).

References

Trichoptera
Articles created by Qbugbot
Insects described in 1859